Saccoglossus bromophenolosus is a species of acorn worm (class Enteropneusta) occurring in the northwestern Atlantic Ocean and the northeastern Pacific Ocean. The scientific name refers to 2,4-dibromophenol, a secondary metabolite present in this worm.

Description
Like other acorn worms, this soft cylindrical worm is divided into three parts, the proboscis, the collar and the trunk. The proboscis is long and slender with a groove along the top. The mouth is located on the underside where it joins the thick, fleshy collar. A fold at the back of the collar overhangs the trunk, and the anus is at the tip of the trunk.

Distribution and habitat
The species is native to the northwestern Atlantic Ocean where its range extends from Maine to Nova Scotia. It is also present in the northeastern Pacific Ocean, in Padilla Bay and Willapa Bay in Washington state, where it is thought to have been introduced with a consignment of oysters from the east coast.

Biology
S. bromophenolosus moves through the sediment by thrusting its proboscis forward and then contracting it longitudinally to form a swelling. This bulge is then worked backwards along the proboscis, which pulls the worm forwards. The collar and trunk follow passively. The beating of cilia also helps move sand and silt. Food particles are trapped in mucus and moved to the mouth by ciliary action, and the worm also swallows a lot of sediment and presumably obtains some nourishment from detritus. The sexes are separate. Fertilisation takes place in the water column. The eggs are yolky and large and development is direct, without a mobile larval stage.

The worm contains high concentrations of 2,4-dibromophenol in its tissues. It is unclear what function this serves, but it may deter predators or convey some measure of resistance to microorganisms.

References

Enteropneusta
Animals described in 1994